Stephen Rowland Skemp (1912–2004) was Archdeacon of the Aegean from 1971 to 1977.

Evans was educated at Wadham College, Oxford and Ripon College, Cuddesdon; and ordained in 1936. After a curacy in Hendon, he served in Bulawayo, Publow, Goxhill, Nunkeeling, Great Stanmore, Athens and Ankara.

He died on 30 June 2004.

Notes

Alumni of Wadham College, Oxford
Alumni of Ripon College Cuddesdon
Archdeacons of the Agean
20th-century English Anglican priests
1912 births
2004 deaths